All About Actresses, also known as The Actress' Ball, is a 2009 French mockumentary film directed by Maïwenn. The title is a reference to the film directed by Roman Polanski, The Fearless Vampire Killers (Le Bal des vampires).

Cast

 Jeanne Balibar : Herself
 Romane Bohringer : Herself
 Julie Depardieu : Herself
 Mélanie Doutey : Herself
 Marina Foïs : Herself
 Estelle Lefébure : Herself
 Maïwenn : Herself
 Linh Dan Pham : Herself
 Charlotte Rampling : Herself
 Muriel Robin : Herself
 Karole Rocher	: Herself
 Karin Viard : Herself
 Joey Starr : Himself
 Yvan Attal : Himself
 Jacques Weber : Himself
 Pascal Greggory : Himself
 Bertrand Blier : Himself
 Christine Boisson : The drama teacher
 Marilyne Canto : Marina's director
 Charlotte Valandrey : Yvan's casting director
 Nina Morato : Marina's casting director
 Laurent Bateau : Marina's doctor 
 Boris Terral : The actor with Jeanne
 Samir Guesmi : Jennifer's husband
 Marie Kremer : Karin's makeup artist
 Georges Corraface	: Jeanne's director

References

External links
 

Films directed by Maïwenn
2000s French-language films
2000s mockumentary films
French comedy-drama films
French mockumentary films
2009 comedy-drama films
2009 films
2000s French films